The name Auring has been used for sixteen tropical cyclones in the Philippines by PAGASA in the Western Pacific Ocean.

 Typhoon Polly (1963) (T6302, 09W, Auring)
 Tropical Storm Ruby (1967) (T6701, 01W, Auring)
 Tropical Storm Sarah (1971) (T7101, 01W, Auring)
 Typhoon Lola (1975) (T7501, 01W, Auring), struck the Philippines
 Typhoon Bess (1979) (T7902, 02W, Auring)
 Typhoon Tip (1983) (T8302, 02W, Auring), struck the Philippines and China
 Typhoon Orchid (1987) (T8701, 01W, Auring), extensive damage on Ulithi Atoll but no deaths reported
 Tropical Storm Sharon (1991) (T9101, 01W, Auring), struck the Philippines
 Tropical Storm Deanna (1995) (T9502, 03W, Auring), struck the Philippines
 Tropical Storm Hilda (1999) (01W, Auring, Japan Meteorological Agency analyzed it as a tropical depression, not as a tropical storm), brought heavy rain to Sabah
 Tropical Depression Auring (2001) (01W), a tropical depression that was only recognized by PAGASA and JTWC
 Severe Tropical Storm Roke (2005) (T0502, 02W, Auring), struck the Philippines
 Tropical Depression Auring (2009), a tropical depression that was recognized by the JMA and PAGASA
 Severe Tropical Storm Sonamu (2013) (T1301, 01W, Auring), early forming storm which made landfall over Mindanao and Palawan
 Tropical Depression Auring (2017) (01W), struck the Philippines.
 Tropical Storm Dujuan (2021) (T2101, 01W, Auring)

Pacific typhoon set index articles